Mauro Albertengo (born 4 January 1990) is an Argentine professional footballer who plays as a forward for Atlético de Rafaela.

Career
Mauro Albertengo, like brother Lucas, began in the youth teams of Atlético de Rafaela, he was with Rafaela for nine years before leaving to join San Isidro in 2011. Spells at Brown San Vicente, Argentino de Quilmes and San Jorge then followed between 2012 and 2016. In February 2016, Albertengo rejoined Argentine Primera División club Atlético de Rafaela and made his senior debut for Rafaela in a 2016 league defeat to San Martín on 3 March. In the following season, 2016–17, Albertengo scored his first goal for the club in a win over the aforementioned San Martín on 29 November. The season ended in relegation for Rafaela.

Albertengo completed a move to Agropecuario ahead of the 2019–20 campaign. He'd appear thirteen times, prior to the competition's curtailment due to the COVID-19 pandemic. In August 2020, Albertengo headed across Primera B Nacional to Sarmiento.

In March 2021, Albertengo signed with Barracas Central on a deal for the rest of the year. At the end of December 2021, he signed a contract extension with the club, until the end of 2022. On 30 May 2022, Albertengo moved to Atlético de Rafaela.

Personal life
He is the brother of fellow footballer Lucas Albertengo.

Career statistics
.

References

External links

1990 births
Living people
People from Castellanos Department
Argentine footballers
Association football forwards
Argentine Primera División players
Primera Nacional players
Atlético de Rafaela footballers
Club Agropecuario Argentino players
Club Atlético Sarmiento footballers
Barracas Central players
Sportspeople from Santa Fe Province